Akheri is an administrative ward in the Meru District of the Arusha Region of Tanzania.
Akheri ward is home to Lake Duluti. The largest settlement in the ward is the town of Tengeru. The ward is also home to Polish refugees WWII Cemetery.  According to the 2002 census, the ward has a total population of 12,243.

References

Wards of Meru District
Wards of Arusha Region